Sundqvist is a Swedish-language surname. Persons with the surname include:

 Anna Sundqvist, Swedish artist and revy artist
 Björn-Erik Sundqvist, Finnish footballer
 Bo Sundqvist, Swedish physicist
 Christoffer Sundqvist, Finnish clarinetist
 Gösta Sundqvist, Finnish singer-songwriter
 Jarrad Sundqvist, Australian rules footballer
 Jörgen Sundqvist (alpine skier), Swedish alpine skier
 Jörgen Sundqvist (ice hockey), Swedish ice hockey player
 Kalle Sundqvist, Swedish sprint canoer
 Kati Sundqvist, Finnish cross-country skier
 Oskar Sundqvist, Swedish ice hockey player
 Stig Sundqvist, Swedish footballer
 Ulf Sundqvist, Finnish politician

Swedish-language surnames